The first season of Korea's Next Top Model (or Do-jeon Supermodel Korea) aired from September to December 2010 on OnStyle. The international destination was Paris.

This season featured fourteen contestants in its final cast. The prizes for this season included: A cash prize of 100,000,000 Korean won, a cover shoot and editorial in W Magazine Korea, a contract with SK-II and a modelling contract with ESteem Entertainment.

The winner was 20-year-old Lee Ji-min.

Episode summaries

Episode 1

Original airdate: September 18, 2010
The final 24 contestants were chosen from the pool of 50 during the auditions.

Episode 2

Original airdate: September 25, 2010
The final 24 were introduced to the host, Jang Yoon-ju, and competed in a runway challenge. They were introduced to a wildcard contestant, Min-sun. After a photo shoot with male models, 14 contestants were chosen as finalists.

Episode 3

Original airdate: October 2, 2010
The 14 girls moved into the model apartment – a penthouse overlooking the city. After receiving makeovers, they did their first official photo shoot, in which they posed as pin-up girls. Yu-ri and Hyo-kyeong's performances landed them in the bottom two and Yu-ri was the first girl eliminated.
 First call-out: Kim Na-rae
 Bottom two: Kim Hyo-kyeong & Kim Yu-ri
 Eliminated: Kim Yu-ri

Episode 4

Original airdate: October 9, 2010
The remaining girls did a high fashion recreation.

 First call-out: Kim Na-rae
 Bottom two: Lee Eun-young & Seon Hye-lim
 Eliminated: Lee Eun-young

Episode 5

Original airdate: October 16, 2010
The girls participated in a paparazzi-themed photo shoot. At panel, it was revealed that two girls would be sent home. The bottom three contestants were Dan-bi, Il-hong and Young-eun. Young-eun was the first to be eliminated. The episode ended on a cliffhanger, with Dan-bi and Il-hong's verdicts being revealed the following episode.
 First call-out: Lee Yoo-kyung
 Bottom three: Seok Dan-bi, Baek Il-hong & Shin Young-eun
 First eliminated: Shin Young-eun

Episode 6

Original airdate: October 23, 2010
Dan-bi was revealed as the second eliminee of the previous week.
 Second eliminated: Seok Dan-bi
The girls worked in conjunction with Project Runway Korea for this week's episode.
 First call-out: Oh Hye-ji
 Bottom two: Park Doo-hee & Kim Ye-ji
 Eliminated: Kim Ye-ji

Episode 7

Original airdate: October 30, 2010
 First call-out: Oh Hye-ji
 Bottom two: Seon Hye-lim & Kim Hyo-kyeong
 Eliminated: Seon Hye-lim

Episode 8

Original airdate: November 6, 2010
 First call-out: Kim Min-sun
 Bottom three: Kim Hyo-kyeong, Baek Il-hong & Lee Ji-min
 Eliminated: Kim Hyo-kyeong & Baek Il-hong

Episode 9

Original airdate: November 13, 2010
 First call-out: Lee Ji-min
 Bottom two: Park Doo-hee & Kim Min-sun
 Eliminated: Kim Min-sun

Episode 10

Original airdate: November 20, 2010
 First call-out: Lee Yoo-kyung
 Bottom two: Oh Hye-ji & Kim Na-rae
 Eliminated: Oh Hye-ji

Episode 11

Original airdate: November 27, 2010
 First call-out: Kim Na-rae
 Bottom two: Park Doo-hee & Lee Yoo-kyung
 Eliminated: Park Doo-hee

Episode 12

Original airdate: December 4, 2010

Episode 13

Original airdate: December 11, 2010
 Final three: Lee Ji-min, Kim Na-rae & Lee Yoo-kyung
 Korea's Next Top Model: Lee Ji-min

Contestants
(ages stated are at start of contest and use the Korean system of determining age)

Summaries

Call-out order

 The contestant was eliminated
 The contestant won the competition
 Episode 1 was a casting episode. In episode 2, the pool of 24 girls were reduced to the final 13 who would move on to the main competition. This first call-out does not reflect their performance. Hye-ji was added to the competition in a last-minute decision, making 14 girls who made it in the competition.
 Episode 5 ended with a cliffhanger with Il-hong and Dan-bi in the bottom two. The elimination was shown the following episode.
 Episode 8 featured a double elimination with the bottom three contestants being in danger of elimination.

Photo Shoot Guide
 Episode 2 Photo Shoot: Jean Shoot with Male Models
 Episode 3 Photo Shoot: Pin-Up Girls
 Episode 4 Photo Shoot: High Fashion Recreations
 Episode 5 Photo Shoot: Paparazzi Shoot
 Episode 6 Photo Shoot: Upcycle Dress Fashion Shoot
 Episode 7 Photo Shoot: Silky Hair Heroes vs Poor Hair Heroes
 Episode 8 Photo Shoot: Underwater Muses
 Episode 9 Photo Shoot: Paris Attractions
 Episode 10 Commercial: SK-II Commercial
 Episode 11 Photo Shoot: Homage to The Birds
 Episode 13 Photo Shoot: Cover of Korean W Magazine

Average  call-out order
Casting call and Episode 13 is not included.

Bottom two/three

 The contestant was eliminated after her first time in the bottom two
 The contestant was eliminated after her second time in the bottom two
 The contestant was eliminated after her third time in the bottom two
 The contestant was eliminated in the final judging and placed as the runner-up

References

Korea's Next Top Model
2010 South Korean television seasons